The 2006–07 Welsh Alliance League is the 23rd season of the Welsh Alliance League, which is in the third level of the Welsh football pyramid.

The league consists of fifteen teams and concluded with Denbigh Town as champions and promoted to the Cymru Alliance. Bottom team Caerwys were relegated to the Clwyd League.

Teams
Prestatyn Town were champions in the previous season. They were replaced by Halkyn United and Holywell Town who were relegated from the Cymru Alliance and Gwynedd League champions Pwllheli.

Grounds and locations

League table

References

Welsh Alliance League seasons
2007–08 in Welsh football leagues